Chip Hall (born November 5, 1973) is an American television producer and writer, best known for his work on the Fox animated sitcom King of the Hill, on which he worked as a writer and producer for six years.  He is currently a writer and producer on the Spike TV comedy, Blue Mountain State.  Amongst his episodes are "LAX", "Marathon Monday" and "Cum Ransom".

Chip is also developing the movie Liam McBain: International Tennis Star and Proper English Geezer at Warner Bros. Pictures with Pete Segal attached to direct.  Liam McBain is a comedy which centers on a 1980s tennis star who is half John McEnroe and half Liam Gallagher from the band Oasis.

He most recently set up "Brightmoor" an animated show at FX with his writing partner ComedianCP and P. Diddy. The show is described as a mix of "Black South Park and Fat Albert set in Inner-City Detroit."

Chip presently lives in West Hollywood, CA and is represented by Chris Licata at Paradigm and Trevor Engelson at Underground Films.  His attorney is Gregg Gellman at Morris Yorn.

Sources

External links

Living people
American male screenwriters
American television producers
1973 births